Sütlüce Pier is a ferry slip on the Golden Horn in Beyoğlu, Istanbul. The Municipal ferry operator, Şehir Hatları, operates hourly ferry service from Eyüp to Üsküdar, stopping at Sütlüce and six other piers on the Golden Horn. This route is known as the Golden Horn Line.

It is unclear when Sütlüce Pier was built, although public ferry service has been operating since the mid 19th century. The pier was rebuilt in 1989.

References

Ferry piers in Istanbul
Beyoğlu